Poggiorsini (Poggiorsinese:  or ) is a comune in the Metropolitan City of Bari, Apulia, south-eastern Italy with a population of 1367.

References

Cities and towns in Apulia